The 1998 NHL Entry Draft was the 36th NHL Entry Draft. It was held on June 27 at the Marine Midland Arena in Buffalo, New York. A total of 258 players were drafted.

The last active players in the NHL from this draft class were Brian Gionta, Mike Fisher and Francois Beauchemin, who all retired after the 2017–18 season.

Selections by round
Club teams are located in North America unless otherwise noted.

Round one

Round two

Round three

Round four

Round five

Round six

Round seven

Round eight

Round nine

Draftees based on nationality

See also
 1998 NHL Expansion Draft
 1998–99 NHL season
 List of NHL first overall draft choices
 List of NHL players

References

External links
 1998 NHL Entry Draft player stats at The Internet Hockey Database
 prosportstransactions.com: 1998 NHL Entry Draft Pick

Draft
National Hockey League Entry Draft